Coelorachis cylindrica  is a species of grass known by the common names cylinder jointtail grass, Carolina jointgrass, and pitted jointgrass. It is native to the southeastern United States.

This grass is a rhizomatous perennial with cylindrical stems growing up to 1.2 meters in height. They are clothed in the sheaths of the leaves. The inflorescence is cylindrical. The spikelets are pitted.

This grass grows on tallgrass prairies, forest edges, and sometimes roadsides.

References

Panicoideae
Grasses of the United States
Flora of the Southeastern United States
Endemic flora of the United States